Tin Zaouatene volcanic field is a volcanic field in the Adrar des Ifoghas of Mali.

References 

Volcanic fields
Holocene volcanoes